The Tenerife giant rat (Canariomys bravoi) is an extinct species of rodent endemic to the island of Tenerife, the largest of the Canary Islands, Spain. Many remains have been found during archeological digs. Most remains are from the Pleistocene. Radiocarbon dating has placed some of the finds in the late Pleistocene.

Discovery
 
Fossilized remains of this animal have been found practically in every part of the island, but especially in deposits in caves or volcanic pipes of the island, where it often appears together with remains of other species such as the giant lizards (Gallotia goliath). In particular, its bony remains have been discovered in large amounts in the deposit of Buenavista del Norte (in the northwest of Tenerife).

Their fossils date back to the Pleistocene epoch. The first fossils were found by the naturalist Telesforo Bravo, from whom the name of the rodent is derived. Biologists Crusafont-Pairó and Petter first described the giant rat in 1964.

The giant rat, along with some other endemic species of the islands, became extinct due to the activities of the initial human colonists, the Guanches, who arrived around 1000 BC, including their introduction of feral cats.

Today, the Museo de la Naturaleza y el Hombre in Santa Cruz de Tenerife exhibits fossil skulls and bones of this animal, as well as faithful reconstructions. Another giant rat of the Canary Islands was Canariomys tamarani.

Description
 
It had a cranium that reached up to seven centimetres in length.

A scientific study published in 2012 compared the Canariomys bravoi species to present-day arboreal rodents such as Phloeomys cumingi, the giant rat of the island of Luzon in the Philippines. The study revealed that among the distinctive features of C. bravoi are claws that develop almost similarly in the anterior and posterior limbs. Also the hind legs longer than the front ones evoke an intermediate form between rats and arboreal murals like Phloeomys. Canariomys bravoi was a strong and powerfully muscled rodent able to move on different substrates from the ground to the trees, and probably had digging skills.

See also 
 List of African animals extinct in the Holocene
 List of extinct animals of Europe
 Island gigantism

References

Mammals of the Canary Islands
Canariomys
Pleistocene rodents
Prehistoric murids
Extinct mammals of Africa
Holocene extinctions
Mammals described in 1964